Natlandia is an extinct genus of prehistoric bony fish that lived during the Maastrichtian stage of the Late Cretaceous epoch.

See also

 Prehistoric fish
 List of prehistoric bony fish

References

Late Cretaceous fish
Late Cretaceous fish of North America
Salmoniformes
Prehistoric ray-finned fish genera